Show Your Hand is the first album by Scottish funk band Average White Band, likely recorded at R.G. Jones Studios, Wimbledon, London, and released in 1973 by MCA Records. After the success of AWB, the album was re-issued in 1975 with a new title, Put It Where You Want It, a different opening track and new cover artwork. The re-issued version finally made it to the Billboard Top 200, peaking at No. 39.

Track listing
Side one
"The Jugglers" (Alan Gorrie) – 4:55
"This World Has Music" (Bonnie Bramlett, Gorrie, Leon Ware) – 5:45
"Twilight Zone" (Roger Ball, Gorrie) – 5:12
"Put It Where You Want It" (Joe Sample, Gorrie, Layne) – 4:00
Side two
"Show Your Hand" (Gorrie) – 3:40
"Back in '67" (Ball, Gorrie, Robbie McIntosh) – 4:00
"Reach Out" (AWB, Ball) – 4:00
"T.L.C." (AWB, Gorrie) – 8:20

On the 1975 MCA re-issue the song "The Jugglers" is replaced by "How Can You Go Home".

Personnel
Average White Band
Malcolm Duncan – tenor saxophone
Hamish Stuart – guitars, lead and backing vocals
Onnie McIntyre – guitars, backing vocals
Roger Ball – piano, clavinet, alto saxophone
Alan Gorrie – bass, lead and backing vocals
Robbie McIntosh – drums, percussion
Technical
Nick Sykes - engineer
John Pasche - design, artwork

References

MCA 345 (Show Your Hand)
Show Your Hand  at [ Allmusic.com]
MCA 475 (Put It Where You Want It)
Put It Where You Want It at [ Allmusic.com]

Average White Band albums
1973 debut albums
MCA Records albums